Guriel Airport  is an airport serving Guriel, Galgaduud, Somalia.

Airlines and destinations

See also
List of airports in Somalia

References

Airports in Somalia
Galguduud